Phosphatidylinositol N-acetylglucosaminyltransferase subunit A (PIG-A, or phosphatidylinositol glycan, class A) is the catalytic subunit of the phosphatidylinositol N-acetylglucosaminyltransferase enzyme, which in humans is encoded by the PIGA gene.

This gene encodes a protein required for synthesis of N-acetylglucosaminyl phosphatidylinositol (GlcNAc-PI), the first intermediate in the biosynthetic pathway of GPI anchor. The GPI anchor is a glycolipid found on many blood cells and serves to anchor proteins to the cell surface. Paroxysmal nocturnal hemoglobinuria, an acquired hematologic disorder, has been shown to result from somatic mutations in this gene. Alternate splice variants have been characterized.

Multiple Congenital Anomalies-Hypotonia-Seizures syndrome type 2 (MCAHS2), also known as PIGA-CDG or PIGA deficiency, has been shown to result from germline mutations in the PIGA gene.

Interactions
PIGA has been shown for interact with PIGQ.

References

Further reading